Aslauga aura is a butterfly in the family Lycaenidae first described by Hamilton Herbert Druce in 1913. It is found in Cameroon, Gabon and the Democratic Republic of the Congo (Equateur and Kivu).

References

External links

Butterflies described in 1913
Aslauga